Niphadoses is a genus of moths of the family Crambidae.

Species
Niphadoses chionotus (Meyrick, 1889)
Niphadoses dengcaolites Wang & Sung, 1978
Niphadoses elachia Common, 1960
Niphadoses hoplites Common, 1960
Niphadoses palleucus Common, 1960

References

Natural History Museum Lepidoptera genus database

Schoenobiinae
Crambidae genera